Center District may refer to the following Slovenian districts:

 Center District, Ljubljana
 Center District, Maribor

See also
 Central District (disambiguation)